The Atlantic Hockey Coach of the Year is an annual award given out at the conclusion of the Atlantic Hockey regular season to the top coach in the conference as voted by the coaches of each Atlantic Hockey team.

Award winners

Winners by school

Multiple Awards

References

Coach of the Year
Atlantic Hockey Coach of the Year